The 1968 Winnipeg municipal election was held on October 23, 1968, to elect mayors, councillors and school trustees in the City of Winnipeg, the Metropolitan Corporation of Greater Winnipeg, and the city's suburban communities.  Most elections were conducted via a single transferable ballot.

Results

Winnipeg

Leonard Claydon, Gurzon Harvey, Ernest Brotman, Gordon Fines, Lillian Hallonquist, Magnus Eliason, Paul Parashin, Joseph Cropo and Max Mulder were elected to two-year terms on the Winnipeg City Council.

Information taken from the Winnipeg Free Press, 24 October 1968.

Greater Winnipeg

Municipal elections in Winnipeg
1968 in Manitoba
Winnipeg